Ook, OoK or OOK may refer to:
 Ook Chung (born 1963), Korean-Canadian writer from Quebec
 On-off keying, in radio technology
 Toksook Bay Airport (IATA code OOK), in Alaska
 Ook!, an esoteric programming language based on Brainfuck 
 Ook, the mascot and name for Northern Alberta Institute of Technology sports teams